Acraea polis, the western musanga acraea, is a butterfly in the family Nymphalidae. It is found in Guinea, Sierra Leone, Liberia, Ivory Coast, Ghana, Nigeria and western Cameroon.

Biology
The habitat consists of secondary forests with Musanga species.

The larvae feed on Musanga cecropioides, Boehmeria and Myrianthus species.

Taxonomy
See Pierre & Bernau, 2014

References

External links

Images representing  Acraea polis at Bold

Butterflies described in 1999
polis